The Eurovision Song Contest is an annual international song competition, held every year by the European Broadcasting Union (EBU) since 1956. This page is a list of people who have acted as presenters of the contest.

Since 1988, it has been the norm to have at least two presenters for the contest. All contests before 1978 have had one presenter, and three contests after 1988 have had only one presenter (these being the 1993, 1995 and 2013 contests). The 1999 contest was the first to consist of three presenters, and this method has been used most often since 2010. The contests from 2018 to 2021 consisted of four presenters each (excluding the cancelled 2020 contest).

Presenters

Green room hosts

Online host

Special events

Presenters born outside the host country 
 Katie Boyle, born in Florence, Italy to an Italian-Russian father and a British-Australian mother
 Mireille Delannoy, born in France
 Helga Guitton, born in Königsberg, East Prussia, Germany (now Kaliningrad, Russia)
 Léon Zitrone, born in Petrograd, Russian Empire (now Saint Petersburg, Russia)
 Lill Lindfors, born in Helsinki, Finland
 Åse Kleveland, born in Stockholm, Sweden to a Norwegian father and a Swedish mother
 Viktor Lazlo, born in Lorient, France
 Fionnuala Sweeney, born in Belfast, United Kingdom
 Ulrika Jonsson, born in Sollentuna, Sweden
 Terry Wogan, born in Limerick, Ireland
 Maria Menounos, born in Medford, Massachusetts, United States to Greek parents
 Nadia Hasnaoui, born in Morocco to a Moroccan father and a Norwegian mother
 Anke Engelke, born in Montréal, Quebec, Canada to German parents
 Katrina Leskanich, born in Topeka, Kansas, United States
 Graham Norton, born in Clondalkin, Ireland
 Daniela Ruah, born in Boston, Massachusetts, United States to Portuguese parents
 Mika, born in Beirut, Lebanon
 Julia Sanina, born in Kyiv, Ukrainian SSR, Soviet Union (now Ukraine)

Presenters who had formerly competed at Eurovision
 Lill Lindfors, represented  in  alongside Svante Thuresson
 Åse Kleveland, represented  in 
 Gigliola Cinquetti, winner of the  contest and runner-up in the  contest for 
 Toto Cutugno, winner of the  contest for 
 Dafna Dekel, represented  in 
 Marie N, winner of the  contest for 
 Alsou, represented  in 
 Stefan Raab, represented  in 
 Eldar Gasimov, winner of the  contest for 
 Måns Zelmerlöw, winner of the  contest for 

Presenters who have been spokespersons

Presenters who resigned
 Chaim Topol (1979)
 Alison Doody (1995)
 Ruslana, winner of the  contest (2005)
 Yana Churikova (2009)

Presenters’ costume designers

Running order and allocation draw presenters 
Prior to each year's contest, a series of draws have been held to determine differing facets of the contest's production, which typically are presided by one or more presenters. Historically a random drawing of lots was held prior to each year's contest to determine the order in which participating countries would perform in the grand final, and since 2004 in the semi-finals; this was abolished in 2013, when the running order began to be determined by the contest producers.

A semi-final allocation draw has been held since 2008, to determine which countries perform in which of the two semi-finals, as well as in which semi-final the automatic finalists have voting rights. The semi-finalist countries are divided into pots based on historical voting patterns, and countries in each pot are then split equally between the two semi-finals. During this draw, the countries are also assigned to perform in either the first or second half of the show; the exact running order is then determined at a later date.

Opening Ceremony presenters

See also 
 List of Junior Eurovision Song Contest presenters

Notes and references

Notes

References

Further reading

 

Presenters
Lists of television presenters
Presenters
Masters of ceremonies